Jacqueline Charlotte Dufresnoy (23 August 1931 – 9 October 2006), better known by her stage name Coccinelle, was a French actress, entertainer and singer. She was transgender, and was the first widely publicized post-war gender reassignment case in Europe, where she was an international celebrity and a renowned club singer.

Life and career 
Born in Paris at rue Notre Dame de Nazareth No. 66 in the 3rd arrondissement of Paris, she took the stage name Coccinelle (French for "Ladybird") when she entered show business, making her debut as a transgender showgirl in 1953 at Chez Madame Arthur where her mother was a flower seller. She later performed regularly at the famous nightclub Le Carrousel de Paris, which also featured regular acts by other famous trans women such as April Ashley and Marie-Pier Ysser.

In 1958, Coccinelle travelled to Casablanca to undergo a vaginoplasty by Georges Burou. She said later, "Dr Burou rectified the mistake nature had made and I became a real woman, on the inside as well as the outside. After the operation, the doctor just said, 'Bonjour, Mademoiselle', and I knew it had been a success."

Coccinelle became a media sensation, and performed the Cherchez la femme revue which ran for 7 months at the Olympia in Paris between 1963 and 1964. In 1987, her autobiography was published, titled Coccinelle par Coccinelle.

Coccinelle married French journalist Francis Bonnet in 1960. Her marriage to Bonnet was dissolved in 1962. She then married Paraguayan dancer Mario Costa in 1963, who died in 1977. She then married fellow transgender activist Thierry Wilson in 1996.

Media sensation 
Coccinelle very quickly became a media sensation upon her return to France after the operation, with a look and stage act based on the prominent sex symbols of the day. Historian Joanne Meyerowitz wrote "the more sexualized MTF showed up in the sensationalized press in the stories on Coccinelle, who worked at Le Carrousel in Paris". 

In 1959 Coccinelle appeared in Europa di notte by director Alessandro Blasetti. That same year, Italian singer Ghigo Agosti dedicated the song Coccinella to her, provoking widespread consternation and controversy. Coccinelle appeared in the 1962 Argentine thriller film Los Viciosos and was the first French trans woman to become a major star, when Bruno Coquatrix splashed her name in red letters on the front of Paris Olympia for her 1963 revue, Cherchez la femme. She later appeared in the 1968 Spanish romantic drama Días de viejo color.

In Israeli slang, the word coccinelle (by Hebrew transliteration − קוקסינל, pronounced [koksiˈnel]) is used as a synonym for transgender, often derogatorily (and also as a general slur for a feminine man).

Activism and later life 
Coccinelle worked extensively as an activist on behalf of transgender people, founding the organization "Devenir Femme" (To Become Woman), which was designed to provide emotional and practical support to those seeking gender reassignment surgery. She also helped establish the Center for Aid, Research, and Information for Transsexuality and Gender Identity. In addition, her first marriage, in 1960, was the first such union to be officially acknowledged by the government of France, thereby establishing transgender people's legal right to marry. Her 1987 autobiography Coccinelle was published by Daniel Filipacchi.

Coccinelle was hospitalised in July 2006 following a stroke. She died on 9 October in Marseille.

Discography 
Coccinelle No 1 (President Records No 38." cda 1052)
 Tu t'fous de moi [You don't care about me]
 L'Amour a fleur de coeur [Heart-deep Love]
 Prends-moi ou laisse-moi [Take me or leave me]
 Tu es là [You are there]

Coccinelle No 2 (President Records No 12" cda 1052)
 Je cherche un millionnaire [I'm looking for a millionaire]
 Avec mon petit faux-cul [With my little false bottom]

Coccinelle - 4 chansons de la Revue de l'Olympia "Chercher la femme" (RCA VICTOR 86.012M - 1963)
 Cherchez la femme [Look for the woman]
 On fait tout à la main [Everything is done by hand]
 C'est sûrement vous [It's probably you]
 Depuis toujours [Since forever]

Star du Carrousel de Paris CD (Marianne Melodie 041625) Compilation of 20 titles.

References

External links
 

1931 births
2006 deaths
Singers from Paris
Transgender women musicians
Transgender actresses
French vedettes
French LGBT rights activists
French LGBT singers
French transgender people
20th-century French women singers
20th-century French LGBT people
21st-century French LGBT people
Transgender singers